Phrynopus kauneorum is a species of frogs in the family Strabomantidae. It is endemic to the Andes of Peru and known from near its type locality in the Pachitea Province, as well as from the Cordillera de Carpish, both in the Huánuco Region. The specific name kauneorum honors Andreas, Meeta, and Rebekka Kaune from Germany.

Description
Only females and juveniles of this species are known. Adult females measure  in snout–vent length—the maximum size is very large for the genus. The head is narrow and relatively short. The snout is short and rounded. Tympanum is absent, but the supratympanic fold is distinct. The fingers and toes have no webbing nor lateral fringes; the digital tips are slightly swollen. Skin of the dorsum is smooth. Dorsal coloration is glaucous with sepia blotches and stripes; one stripe runs from the beginning of the nose and extends across the upper eyelid to the inguinal region; another one runs dorsolaterally from behind the supratympanic fold to the middle of body.

Habitat and conservation
Agricultural activities, primarily potato cultivation and livestock ranching, are the main threats to it. It is not known to occur in any protected areas.

References

kauneorum
Endemic fauna of Peru
Amphibians of Peru
Amphibians of the Andes
Frogs of South America
Amphibians described in 2002
Taxa named by Gunther Köhler
Taxonomy articles created by Polbot